is the second opening theme song from the Japanese anime Kirarin Revolution. The song was released as Kirari Tsukishima's second single, who Kusumi portrays in the show.

Background and release

"Balalaika" is the second opening theme song to Kirarin Revolution and is performed by Koharu Kusumi from Morning Musume, who voices the main character, Kirari Tsukishima. The song borrows influences from Russian folk music.

The single was released on October 25, 2006, under the Zetima label. "Mizuiro Melody", the third ending theme song to Kirarin Revolution, was included as a B-side and is also performed by Kusumi under her character's name. The limited edition featured an alternate cover and came with an exclusive version of Takara Tomy's paper doll Millefeui Card from Kirarin Revolution.

A video single was released on November 8, 2006.

Music video

The music video was directed by Hideo Kawatani and produced by Tetsushi Suehiro. It features Kusumi dressed up as her character, Kirari Tsukishima, and dancing at a magic show. A version featuring the choreography was released with the video single.

Reception

The CD single debuted at #8 in the Oricon Weekly Singles Chart and charted for 23 weeks. The single sold 28,132 copies on its first week and 72,709 copies in total. The video single charted at #13 on the Oricon Weekly DVD Charts.

Editors at Barks noted that the song's "Hoo! Ha!" chanting reminded them of "Koi no Dance Site" by Morning Musume. In their review of the music video, they commented that it highlighted Kusumi's sex appeal in an innocent way compared to recent Hello! Project music videos, such as "Some Boys! Touch" by Maki Goto and "Melodies" by GAM.  The editors noted that compared to their videos, Kusumi's image and smile evoked fond memories of a past crush from elementary school and exuded a "sparkle."

"Balalaika" became associated with the "Yaranaika?" Internet meme after a fan-made parody version with homoerotic lyrics was used as the meme's theme song.

Track listing

Single

DVD single

Charts

Single

DVD single

References

External links 
 Up-Front Works Discography: CD entry, DVD entry

Songs about musical instruments
2006 singles
2006 songs
Anime songs
Hello! Project songs
Children's television theme songs
Kirarin Revolution
Animated series theme songs
Zetima Records singles